Rogala is a surname. Notable people with the surname include:

 Rogala coat of arms
 Janusz (Marja Stefan Rogala) Kaluski (1924–2010), sapper in the Polish Army
 Miroslaw Rogala (born 1954), Polish-American video artist and interactive artist
 Ryszard Rogala (born 1975), Polish Paralympic powerlifter

See also
 
 Rogal (disambiguation)
 Rogale (disambiguation)
 Rogalski

Polish-language surnames